Robert Norman Scott Good (29 March 1885 – 16 June 1962) was an Australian sportsman who played with University in the Victorian Football League (VFL) and represented Western Australia as a first-class cricketer.

Life and career
Norman Good was born in 1885 to Charles Edwin Good and Sarah Cowie Scott and was educated at Geelong Grammar School before studying medicine at the University of Melbourne. He was an accomplished sportsman and earned a triple blue for representing the university in rowing, cricket and football. He played district cricket for University for several seasons and made four appearances for University in the first half of the 1909 VFL season.

After graduating he served as medical officer at the Ballarat Public Hospital for a term, and then took a position as Resident Medical Officer at the Children's Hospital, Melbourne. In July 1909 he accepted a position as Resident Medical Officer at the Perth Children's Hospital, which ended his senior football career. While in Western Australia he made two appearances for Western Australia in first-class cricket.

In 1913 Norman Good married Viola Mary Frances Wettenhall and they commenced married life in Young, New South Wales. He enlisted for service as a captain with the Australian Army Medical Corps in World War I in July 1918 but the war ended before he was called up. Good played a prominent role as senior doctor in Young and took part in the sporting life of the town, taking a strong interest in the tennis and golf clubs.

In 1923 the Good family moved back to Victoria and soon settled in Geelong where he practiced medicine for over 20 years. After retirement Good moved to Mitcham in Melbourne's outer eastern suburbs. He died in 1962, survived by his wife and five children.

See also
 List of Western Australia first-class cricketers

References

External links 
 
 
 
 CricketArchive: Norman Good

1885 births
1962 deaths
People educated at Geelong Grammar School
Melbourne Medical School alumni
Australian military personnel of World War I
University Football Club players
Cricketers from Melbourne
Australian cricketers
Western Australia cricketers
Australian rules footballers from Melbourne
Medical doctors from Melbourne
People from East Melbourne
Military personnel from Melbourne